Jordan Dane (born 1953) is a romantic thriller young adult fiction novelist. She sold her first three-book series in auction to Avon/HarperCollins in June 2006 and another three-book thriller series in May 2007. The first series was released April through June 2008; titles and release dates for the second series were released beginning in February 2009.

Pursuing publication since 2003, Dane has received awards in 33 writing competitions, including Publishers Weekly Best Book of 2008 for Mass-Market for debut novel, No One Heard Her Scream. She is a member of Romance Writers of America, Mystery Writers of America, Sisters in Crime, and the International Thriller Writers.

Bibliography

Adult fiction 
No One Heard Her Scream (April 1, 2008) 
A detective barred from the investigation into the abduction and murder of her sister is forced to take another case. But when she finds skeletal remains buried in the wall of an old theatre are from a woman close to her sister's age, the hunt for a killer becomes a vendetta for justice.

No One Left to Tell (May 1, 2008) 
A hit man's body serves as a message from the past, unraveling the lives of people touched by an unsolved crime. A woman detective sifts through the tragic memories of a reluctant man whose past holds the key to finding a killer.

No One Lives Forever (June 1, 2008) 
A mysterious woman assassin barges into a man's Chicago flat, attempting to collect an old marker, begging his help to free a man kidnapped in Brazil. He's got seven days to attempt an impossible rescue of the father he never knew.

Evil Without A Face (Feb 1, 2009) 
An illusive web of imposters on the Internet lures a deluded teen from her Alaskan home and launches a chain reaction collision course with an unlikely tangle of heroes who uncover a terrifying global conspiracy. They’re battling a new kind of criminal. And soon their race for answers will become a dangerous struggle for survival.

The Wrong Side of Dead (Nov 1, 2009) 
Enigmatic Seth Harper, computer wizard and friend to bounty hunter Jessica Beckett, is framed for a heinous murder and becomes a sacrificial lamb to a ruthless killer.

The Echo of Violence (forthcoming, Sept 1, 2010) 
Terrorists attack a Haitian missionary school fundraiser to take hostages, forcing Sentinels' agent Alexa Marlowe into an unlikely alliance with a relentless mercenary.

Reckoning for the Dead (forthcoming, October 1, 2011) 
The covert vigilante organization called the Sentinels has a new leader virtually overnight when Garrett Wheeler goes missing, leaving operative Alexa Marlowe to buck the system to find him. And when Jessie's DNA turns up at a grisly crime scene committed when she was only a child, she's forced to deal with a past shrouded in mystery.

Young-adult fiction 

In The Arms of Stone Angels - A Young Adult Novel (April 1, 2011)  
A 16-year-old girl is forced to return to a small Oklahoma town where she was the only witness to a murder. She had turned in the killer, an outcast boy of the Euchee tribe, and the first boy she ever loved.

On a Dark Wing - A Young Adult Novel (forthcoming, January 1, 2012)  
When 16-year-old Abbey Chandler cheated Death and lived past her expiration date, her lucky break came at a heartbreaking price—and Death has never forgotten.

Sources

References

External links 

American romantic fiction writers
21st-century American novelists
Living people
1953 births
American thriller writers
American writers of young adult literature
American women novelists
Women romantic fiction writers
21st-century American women writers
Women mystery writers
Women writers of young adult literature
Women thriller writers